Mungo Park is a Danish theatre in Allerød, 35 kilometers north of Copenhagen. Founded in 1985 under the name Dr Dante, it got its present name in 1992. It has been a sandbox for talent and has been important in the development of modern Danish theatre.

See also
Imperial Theater, Copenhagen
Lille Grönnegade Theatre

External links
Mungo Park website

Theatre companies in Denmark
Theatres in Denmark
Allerød Municipality
Buildings and structures in the Capital Region of Denmark
Tourist attractions in the Capital Region of Denmark
Buildings and structures in Allerød Municipality